David Pelletier (born July 14, 1982 in Lunenburg, Massachusetts) is an American pair skater. With Andrea Varraux, Pelletier won the 2003 Junior Grand Prix event in Croatia and placed fourth in Ostrava. They went on to place seventh at the Junior Grand Prix Final. Pelletier and Varraux are the 2004 US National junior bronze medalists and placed eighth at the World Junior Figure Skating Championships that year.

In 2005, after his split with Andrea Varraux, he skated with, but did not compete with, Anchalee Voogd. Following their split he moved to Switzerland and Italy to study and skate.

A short clip of his skating can be seen on America's Next Top Model Cycle 9.

Pelletier is not related to Canadian pair skater David Pelletier.

Results

Pairs
(with Varraux)

References

External links
 
 Pairs on Ice profile
 

American male pair skaters
1982 births
Living people
People from Lunenburg, Massachusetts
Sportspeople from Worcester County, Massachusetts